The Park Hill Fire Station and Water Company Complex is a collection of historic public facilities at 3417-21 Magnolia Street in North Little Rock, Arkansas.  The complex consists of a fire station, a water company office, two concrete reservoirs, and two stone pump houses, all built in 1938 with funding support from the Works Progress Administration.  The fire station and water company office are distinguished architecturally by their fieldstone exteriors and Mediterranean style, including red tiled roofs.  They were designed by the Little Rock firm of Brueggeman, Swaim and Allen.

The complex was listed on the National Register of Historic Places in 1993.

See also
 Old Central Fire Station (North Little Rock, Arkansas)
 National Register of Historic Places listings in Pulaski County, Arkansas

References

Fire stations completed in 1938
Buildings and structures in North Little Rock, Arkansas
National Register of Historic Places in Pulaski County, Arkansas
Individually listed contributing properties to historic districts on the National Register in Arkansas
Fire stations on the National Register of Historic Places in Arkansas
Infrastructure completed in 1938
Water supply infrastructure in Arkansas
1938 establishments in Arkansas
Water supply infrastructure on the National Register of Historic Places
Works Progress Administration in Arkansas
Mediterranean Revival architecture in Arkansas